Sarah Phillips (born 3 July 1967) is a Scottish cyclist who competed for the United Kingdom as a road cyclist in the 1996 Summer Olympics. She participated in the women's road race and women's time trial at the 1996 Olympics, finishing 19th in the road race and 21st in the time trial.

References

External links
 profile at sports-reference.com

Scottish female cyclists
Cyclists at the 1996 Summer Olympics
Olympic cyclists of Great Britain
Living people
People from Stonehaven
1967 births
Sportspeople from Aberdeenshire